Public transport in Bratislava is managed by Dopravný podnik Bratislava, a city-owned company. The transport system is known as Mestská hromadná doprava (MHD, Municipal Mass Transit), and the network is the largest in Slovakia. The history of public transportation in Bratislava began with the opening of the first tram route in 1895, when the city was in  the Kingdom of Hungary, part of the Austro-Hungarian empire. Passengers must buy their tickets before entering the vehicle. Revenue from tickets covers approximately 40% of expenses, with the other 60% paid by the city.

History 

At the end of the 19th century, Bratislava (then Pozsony in Hungarian and Pressburg in German) was still suffering after losing its status as the capital of the Kingdom of Hungary. Now merely a provincial city of middling political and economic importance, its development lagged behind its European neighbours. The main means of transport at this time was horse-drawn and later steam-powered tramways.

In 1868, buses appeared in the city, but they could not meet the demands for transport. On 23 March 1881 an engineer from Vienna, Nicolaus Markovits, submitted a project plan for a city horse-driven railway in Bratislava to the directors of the Hungarian royal state railways. Its route was from the Danube riverbank through the city to the Austrian state railway station. It was supposed to be connected to the Bratislava – Trnava wagonway, belonging to the Hungarian royal state railways.

In the 1990s, traffic jams became a routine occurrence in Bratislava, with public transport vehicles becoming stuck at places like Patrónka or Prístavný most. A major contributing factor was the lack of a ring road, which today consists of parts of the D1 and D2 motorways in Bratislava. While two crucial bridges over the river Danube, Prístavný most and Lafranconi bridge, partially opened in 1983 and 1990 respectively, it was not until 2002 that the Prievoz viaduct on the D1 motorway opened, the D1 part Viedenská – Prístavný most was finished in 2005 and the Sitina Tunnel completed the ring in 2007.

Description 
The system uses three main types of vehicles: buses, trams and trolleybuses. Buses cover almost the entire city and go to the most remote boroughs and areas, with 70 daily routes, 20 night routes and other routes on certain occasions.

Trams

Trolleybuses 

 The first trolleybus service in Bratislava was established 19 July 1909; thus it is the second oldest such system in the country after the one in the High Tatras. This first line ran from the Roth bullet factory on Pražská Street to Vydrica Valley. Due to technical and financial difficulties, the service on this line was terminated after six years, in 1915. In the period between the world wars, Bratislava was left without a trolleybus system. The first talks about its restoration began just before the Second World War.

Trolleybuses returned to the city on 31 July 1941. Line M connected the Slovak National Theatre and Bratislava main railway station. In 1951, the first Škoda 7Tr trolleybuses appeared. In 1953, trolleybuses reached Trnavské mýto, and two years later began serving Šafárikovo námestie. Most of the current trolleybus infrastructure was built before 1960. Afterwards, buses started to be preferred in Bratislava. Many trolleybus lines were shortened or closed altogether. After the 1970s energy crisis, the importance of trolleybuses increased somewhat. New lines were built and new vehicles were bought. In 1982, the Škoda 14Tr appeared in the city. Between 1960 and 1990 there were about ten routes (210 – 220).

During the 1990s, Škoda 15Tr trolleybuses appeared, and replaced the Škoda Sanos vehicles. In 1999, a new line to Národný ústav srdcových chorôb (NÚSCH) and Národný onkologický ústav was opened. The last line to be opened was a short section from the Patrónka junction to the Vojenská nemocnica built in 2013.

Most of the trolleybus services are now covered by new Škoda 30Tr and Škoda 31Tr trolleybuses delivered between 2013 and 2015.

Buses 
DPB operates 20 night routes between the hours of 23:30 and 03:30 (Mon-Sun). Fares are the same at night as during the day. The central transfer hub is Central Station and the sub-link transfer hub is Hodžovo Square. The basic interval of night services is 60 minutes, which is reduced to 30 minutes at certain times. DPB offer additional late night services during certain holidays, such as New Year's Eve.

Ticketing 

Single tickets are available at pre-sale points such as newsstands, ticket machines and DPB offices and customer has to validate them in stamping machine on board the vehicle at the beginning of his journey. Customers can choose between the 30-minute tickets (€0.90),  or the 60-minute tickets (€1.20). All tickets are transferable. A 50% discount is offered to children, students, pensioners, while some other groups of customers such as passengers over 70 years can travel for free. These tickets are valid on all DPB lines within Slovakia, including night services (N21-N99). Prepaid tickets and free travel for certain groups of passengers apply on night routes as well. Tickets can't be bought on board.

So called tourist tickets are available with validity of 24 hours, 48 hours, 72 hours or 168 hours. Tickets can be purchased at ticket machines, DPB offices and other pre-sale points such as hotels or tourist agencies with prices ranging from €4.50 for 24 hours ticket to €15.00 for one week ticket. These tickets are issued on a same stock as single tickets and must be validated at the beginning of the first journey. No discounts are available. Tickets are valid on DPB service within Bratislava (fare zones 100 and 101), including night services.

SMS tickets are available to customers of Slovak mobile providers. SMS tickets can only be used on DPB services within the city of Bratislava, including night services, and are offered in three types: a 40-minutes ticket for €1.00, a 70-minutes ticket for €1.40 or a 24-hours ticket for €4.50.

Travelcards are available for 7, 30, 90 or 365 days and are issued within Integrovaný dopravný systém v Bratislavskom kraji (IDS BK; literally Integrated transit system of Bratislava region) and therefore are valid not only on DPB services but also on regional buses of Slovak Lines and regional trains of Železničná spoločnosť Slovensko. When purchasing an IDS BK travelcard, the passenger can choose its territorial validity – for this purpose the area of IDS BK is split into fare zones. The price is calculated based on the number of fare zones purchased. Travelcards are valid also on night services.

To purchase an IDS BK travelcard the customer needs a smartcard accepted by IDS BK operators. These are smartcards issued by DPB, Slovak Lines and Železničná spoločnosť Slovensko, a student card issued by selected Slovak schools and universities as well as Bratislavská mestská karta which is a Maestro PayPass card issued only to residents of Bratislava by participating banks. Customer can then load a travelcard at ticket offices of participating operators, some DPB ticket machines or via websites of IDS BK operators. Online purchase is only available at least one day before the first day of the travelcard validity – this is to ensure enough time for all operators' control devices (such as regional bus cash registers, or train conductor's control devices) to synchronize data about online tickets. Such synchronization is necessary since online tickets are not physically loaded into smartcard's chip when purchased. Instead, all control devices have database of tickets purchased online and compare loaded card's ID with this database. When purchasing travelcard on Bratislavská mestská karta, 10% discount from price of Bratislava zones is provided by City of Bratislava.

Tickets for animals, bigger baggage and bicycle transport must be purchased separately. A 15-minutes reduced travel ticket is used for this purpose and is valid for 180 minutes in this case.
Transport of baggage not exceeding 60×45×25 cm, or of an animal transported in a container not exceeding these dimensions are free of charge.
Bicycle transport is possible only on weekends and work holidays (whole day) or in intervals between 09:00–13:00 and 18:00–06:00 on workdays.

Some other special offers are also available, most notably discounted tickets available to customers of Železničná spoločnosť Slovensko together with train ticket to Bratislava, or free use of DPB services for customers arriving to Bratislava on selected EURegio tickets of Österreichische Bundesbahnen.

There is no ticket inspections when boarding DPB vehicles (except regional lines in some situations). Instead, random inspections by plain clothes ticket inspectors are conducted. It is mandatory for a ticket inspector to identify themselves by a company badge and an employee ID when asked to do so. The penalties for failing to comply with the transport rules are as follows:
€50 when paid by card or cash at the time of the inspection or within 5 workdays, €70 when paid within 30 days from the time of the inspection, €5 in case of forgotten prepaid ticket or discount document, €5 in case of unpaid transport of animals, baggage or bicycles.

If the penalty is not paid at the time of the inspection, the inspectors have the right to ascertain the passenger's identity by means of inspecting their ID card, driver's license, passport or residence permit. If this is not possible, the inspector will cooperate with the City or National Police with the goal of discovering the passenger's identity.

International services
On international services operated by DPB (routes 801 to Raika in Hungary and 901 to Hainburg an der Donau in Austria), special fares apply when crossing the border. Tickets cost €1.50 with a 50% discount available to some groups of customers (such as youth or seniors) and are valid for one journey without transfer, irrespective of the length of the journey. These tickets are purchased from driver. Minor discount is available when buying return ticket. When boarding in Hungary, fares can also be paid in Hungarian Forint.

For domestic journeys in Slovakia made on 801 services, standard domestic fares described above apply. All other kinds of domestic journeys (domestic journey in Hungary or any domestic journey on 901) are forbidden. Special offers are available on 901 services such as weekly tickets or discounted tickets, including use of the S7 route of the Vienna S-Bahn.

Transport junctions 
Transport junctions include Trnavské mýto, Račianske mýto, Patrónka, Bratislava main railway station, Zochova and Mlynské Nivy.

Vehicles 
Dopravný podnik Bratislava operates three types of vehicles. The current line-up comprises 481 buses, 168 trolleybuses (including 21 dual-mode buses) and 203 trams. The tables below list the individual models used today and in the past.

Routes 
Operating hours are from 4:00 am to 11:30 pm every day. Operating hours of night lines are 11:30 pm to 4:00 am every day.

See also 
 Transport in Bratislava – for information about the transport in Bratislava in general
 Economy of Bratislava – for more information about the economic background of Bratislava

References 

Public transport in Slovakia
Transport in Bratislava
600 V DC railway electrification